Typhula idahoensis (syn. T. ishikariensis) is a plant pathogen infecting cereals (barley, oat, wheat and rye).

References

Fungal plant pathogens and diseases
Cereal diseases
Typhulaceae
Fungi described in 1940